Poles in Sweden are citizens and residents of Sweden who emigrated from Poland.

Demographics

According to Statistics Sweden, as of 2016, there are a total 88,704 Poland-born immigrants living in Sweden. They include both native Poles, as well as descendants of Polish Jewish immigrants from Poland.

Education
In 2010, there were 4,186 students with Polish as their mother tongue who participated in the state-run Swedish for Immigrants adult language program. Of these pupils, 251 had 0–6 years of education in their home country (Antal utbildningsår i hemlandet), 241 had 7–9 years of education in their home country, and 3,694 had 10 years education or more in their home country. As of 2012, 5,100 pupils with Polish as their mother tongue and 5,079 Poland-born students were enrolled in the language program.

Organizations

There are several Polish organizations in Sweden, incl. the Polish Institute in Stockholm, the Polish Cultural Association in Gothenburg, and Polonia Center in Gothenburg.

Notable people
Anna Anka
Dorotea Bromberg
Paula Bieler
Anitha Bondestam
Paweł Cibicki
Wonna I DeJong
Jerzy Einhorn
Greekazo
Peter Jablonski
Catherine Jagiellon
Peter Jewszczewski
Katrine Marcal (born Kielos to Polish immigrant parents)
Kissie (Alexandra Nilsson-Petroniak, her mother is a Polish immigrant)
Oscar Lewicki
Henryk Lipp
Stefan Liv
Jerzy Luczak-Szewczyk
Bea Malecki
Dominika Peczynski
Martin Rolinski
Eliza Roszkowska Öberg
Thomas Rusiak
Jerzy Sarnecki
Danny Saucedo
Izabella Scorupco
Sebastian Siemiatkowski
Czeslaw Slania
Amanda Sokolnicki (political editor of DN)
Bea Szenfeld
Robert Wahlström
Cissi Wallin born in Sweden to Polish parents
Michael Winiarski (journalist in DN)
Peter Wolodarski
Michal Zajkowski
Maciej Zaremba
Małgorzata Pieczyńska
Z.E. (born to Polish parents as Józef Wojciechowicz)
Katrin Zytomierska

See also 
 Poland–Sweden relations

References

Poles

Polish minorities
Poles